Primary Industries and Regions SA (PIRSA), also known as Primary Industries and Regions South Australia, and the Department of Primary Industries and Regions SA, is an agency of the South Australian Government whose focus is the economic development of the state of South Australia. Its key areas of work include primary sector industries (in South Australia, mainly farming), and biosecurity.

Description
The agency is referred to as the Department of Primary Industries and Regions SA on the main government website, but refers to itself as Primary Industries and Regions SA (PIRSA) on its own website. Along with SARDI, PIRSA has been located at the Waite Research Precinct, alongside the University of Adelaide's Waite campus since about 1994.

A new chief executive, Michelle Edge, was appointed on 10 March 2020, after Scott Ashby's contract was due to expire in April 2020.

The purpose of the agency is to "grow primary industries and drive regional development". Its key areas of work include primary sector industries (in SA, mainly agriculture, viticulture and farming of livestock), marine aquaculture, and biosecurity. Agribusiness, covering "food and beverage, field crops, meat and livestock, wine, seafood, horticulture and forestry sectors" are seen as mainstays and growth areas of the South Australian economy.

The Fisheries and Aquaculture division manages the state's fish stocks, along with industry and the community, by developing and implementing policy and regulations to ensure sustainable development of the aquaculture industry. It employs Fisheries Officers to monitor compliance with fishing regulations.

PIRSA runs a grants program, for farm industry business owners and operators.

SARDI
The South Australian Research and Development Institute (SARDI) is the State Government's principal research institute, and forms part of PIRSA.

Organisational history
In October 1992 the South Australian Department of Agriculture, the Department of Fisheries, and the Department of Woods and Forests merged to form Primary Industries South Australia (PISA). In late 1996 or early 1997 the name of Mines and Energy South Australia was changed to Mines and Energy Resources South Australia (MERSA).

In October 1997, PISA and MERSA merged to form Primary Industries and Resources SA, or Department of Primary Industries and Resources SA (PIRSA).

In 2011/12 it changed its name to Primary Industries and Regions SA.

In early 2019, the Pastoral Board of South Australia, which governs pastoral leases in South Australia, moved from the Department for Environment and Water, to PIRSA.

In August 2019, PIRSA and SARDI entered a partnership with the University of Adelaide, in which scientists in diverse disciplines will be able to access PIRSA's research farms share their academic knowledge to the agricultural sector. The collaboration is anticipated to help develop SA's expertise in dryland agriculture, by encouraging multi-disciplinary research and help to bring about new export opportunities.

New Biosecurity Act for SA

, PIRSA is managing a review of current biosecurity legislation in South Australia, which has until now been covered by multiple pieces of legislation, with the aim of creating a new single and cohesive Biosecurity Act for the state based on the current policy developed by PIRSA.

Examples of PIRSA's work
In November 2007, PIRSA administered a travel survey in Adelaide, which identified the need for secure parking for bicycles in the city. A parking station for 21 bikes was built in a basement at the Grenfell Centre, which proved very popular. It also established a Bicycle User Group (BUG).

Two men were caught fishing at Wallaroo by PIRSA Fisheries Officers for snapper during the annual closure period in December 2014, and later fined  for failing to comply with several offences.

PIRSA were involved, along with other agencies, in impact assessment of the damage done to many types of agricultural enterprises in South Australia by the December 2019 bushfires, in order to help with landholders' recovery  from the fire. Advice on caring for stock, technical support and coordinating various types of assistance were given those who suffered losses from the fires, many of whom were located around Cudlee Creek and on Kangaroo Island.

Alternative names
These names are supplied by the authority record held by Libraries Australia :
Primary Industries and Resources South Australia
South Australia. Dept. of Primary Industries and Resources
South Australia. Department of Primary Industries and Resources
P.I.R.S.A.
PIRSA
South Australia. Primary Industries and Resources SA
South Australia. Dept. of Primary Industries and Natural Resources

Some of the above are standardised names used by librarians, which in natural English as per article names here would be Department of Primary Industries and Regions, as per sa.gov.au .

References

External links

Agriculture in South Australia
Biosecurity
Government agencies of South Australia
Primary industry departments in Australia